Hyōdō (written: 兵藤) is a Japanese surname. Notable people with the surname include:

Akihiro Hyodo (born 1982), Japanese footballer
, Japanese footballer
Mako Hyōdō (born 1962), Japanese voice actress
Shingo Hyodo (born 1985), footballer
Tadashi Hyōdō (1899–1980), first Japanese woman aviator licensed in Japan

Japanese-language surnames